Haematoxenus is a genus of parasitic alveolates of the phylum Apicomplexa.

The type species is Haematoxenus veliferus.

History

This genus was described by Uilenberg in 1964.

Description

The species in this genus are transmitted by ticks. The species appear to non pathogenic to the hosts.

The genus has been found in Chad, the Democratic Republic of Congo, Tanzania and Uganda.

Haematoxenus separatus infects sheep and is transmitted by the tick Rhipicephalus evertsi.

Haematocenus veliferus infects cattle and the African buffalo and is spread by the tick Amblyomma variegatum.

References

Piroplasmida
Apicomplexa genera
Parasites of mammals